Paul-Georges Ntep de Madiba (born 29 July 1992) is a Cameroonian professional footballer who plays for the Cameroon national team. He plays as a forward and is known for his quick pace and technical skill.

Club career 
Ntep was born in Douala, the largest city in Cameroon. He moved to France at the age of eight to live with his aunt who was situated in the commune of Grigny in southern Paris. He began his career at US Ris Orangis and spent two years at the club. During his stint with Ris Orangis, he embarked on several trials with professional clubs, which included Auxerre, however, he was not signed. In 2005, Ntep joined the under-14 team of Viry-Châtillon and, after a year's stint with another amateur club (ESA Linas-Montlhéry), signed with CS Brétigny Foot; a club that trained French internationals Patrice Evra and Jimmy Briand. While training at Brétigny, Ntep impressed club coaches and officials and, in 2009, was offered a three-day trial with professional club Auxerre, with whom Brétigny share a partnership. After a successful trial, he was signed to an stagiaire (internship) contract.

Auxerre
Ntep  began the 2009–10 season training with the club's under-18 team. Midway through the season, he joined the club's reserve team in the Championnat de France amateur. Ntep appeared in 14 matches for the team scoring two goals. For the 2010–11 season, he began training with the senior team. Ntep was also named to the team's roster to appear in the UEFA Champions League. On 16 October 2010, he made the bench in the team's 1–0 defeat to Bordeaux. A week later, Ntep  made his professional debut in a Coupe de la Ligue match against Bastia appearing as a substitute in the 31st minute for Dennis Oliech. Auxerre won the match 4–0.

Rennes
On 30 January 2014, Ntep joined Ligue 1 side Stade Rennais on a three-and-a-half year deal.

Wolfsburg
In January 2017, Ntep joined the squad of German Bundesliga team VfL Wolfsburg on a contract until 2021. On 11 February 2020, Wolfsburg released Ntep.

Saint-Étienne (loan)
On 17 January 2018, Ntep joined Ligue 1 side Saint-Étienne on a season-long loan.

Kayserispor (loan)
On 25 August 2019, Ntep joined Turkish club Kayserispor on a season-long loan.

Guingamp 
On 13 May 2020, Guingamp confirmed the signing of Ntep on a free transfer.

Boavista 
After a disappointing season in Ligue 2, his contract with Guingamp ended and Ntep once again became a free agent, allowing him to join Primeira Liga club Boavista after the end of the regular transfer window, being announced as a new signing on 4 September 2021 by the Porto team. With a total of 19 appearances for Boavista, and one goal, Ntep left the club at the end of the 2021-22 season.

International career

France 
Though Ntep was born in Cameroon, he is a French youth international having starred for the under-18 team in 2010. Three years later, he received the call from France U21 to compete in the Toulon Tournament.

He is eligible to play for either Cameroon or France at senior level. On 24 May 2015, Ntep received a call-up to France's senior squad by coach Didier Deschamps to play in friendlies against Belgium and Albania. He made his debut on 7 June 2015 in a 4–3 defeat to Belgium.

Cameroon 
In August 2018 Ntep switched his allegiance to Cameroon and was nominated for the match against Comoros in the 2019 Africa Cup of Nations qualification Group B.

Career statistics
Scores and results list Cameroon's goal tally first, score column indicates score after each Ntep goal.

References

External links 

 
 
 
 
 

1992 births
Living people
Footballers from Douala
Cameroonian footballers
Cameroon international footballers
French footballers
Association football wingers
France international footballers
France under-21 international footballers
France youth international footballers
French sportspeople of Cameroonian descent
Naturalized citizens of France
ESA Linas-Montlhéry players
ES Viry-Châtillon players
AJ Auxerre players
Stade Rennais F.C. players
VfL Wolfsburg players
AS Saint-Étienne players
VfL Wolfsburg II players
Kayserispor footballers
En Avant Guingamp players
Boavista F.C. players
Ligue 1 players
Ligue 2 players
Championnat National players
Bundesliga players
Regionalliga players
Süper Lig players
Primeira Liga players
Dual internationalists (football)
French expatriate footballers
Cameroonian expatriate footballers
Expatriate footballers in Germany
Expatriate footballers in Turkey
Expatriate footballers in Portugal
French expatriate sportspeople in Germany
Cameroonian expatriate sportspeople in Germany
French expatriate sportspeople in Turkey
Cameroonian expatriate sportspeople in Turkey
French expatriate sportspeople in Portugal
Cameroonian expatriate sportspeople in Portugal
Black French sportspeople